Diethylamine is an organic compound with the formula (CH3CH2)2NH. It is a secondary amine. It is a flammable, weakly alkaline liquid that is miscible with most solvents. It is a colorless liquid, but commercial samples often appear brown due to impurities. It has a strong ammonia-like odor.

Production and uses
Diethylamine is made by the alumina-catalyzed reaction of ethanol and ammonia. It is obtained together with ethylamine and triethylamine. Annual production of three ethylamines was estimated in 2000 to be 80,000,000 kg.

It is used in the production of corrosion inhibitor N,N-diethylaminoethanol, by reaction with ethylene oxide. It is also a precursor to a wide variety of other commercial products.

Diethylamine is also sometimes used in the illicit production of LSD.

Supramolecular structure

Diethylamine is the smallest and simplest molecule that features a supramolecular helix as its lowest energy aggregate. Other similarly sized hydrogen-bonding molecules favor cyclic structures.

Safety
Diethylamine has low toxicity, but the vapor causes transient impairment of vision.

References

External links
Hazardous Substance Fact Sheet
CDC - NIOSH Pocket Guide to Chemical Hazards

Alkylamines